Leptopeza flavipes is a species of fly in the family Hybotidae. It is found in the  Palearctic .

References

External links
Images representing Leptopeza flavipes at BOLD

Hybotidae
Insects described in 1820
Asilomorph flies of Europe